James William Russell (October 1, 1918 – November 24, 1987) was an American professional baseball outfielder. He played in Major League Baseball (MLB) for the Pittsburgh Pirates, Boston Braves, and Brooklyn Dodgers between 1942 and 1951.

Background 
Russell was born in Fayette City, Pennsylvania, on October 1, 1918, the son of James Walch "Doc" Russell and Lillian Johnson. Russell  never finished high school, but instead went out to work mines to bolster his family's financial situation. Jim played baseball with rocks (for balls) and tree limbs (for bats) in alleyways when he was a youngster. As a youth, he contracted rheumatic fever twice; his baseball career would be shortened because of his rheumatic heart disease.

Baseball career 
In , Russell led the Pirates in hitting with a .312 batting average and 181 total hits, and hit the first pinch-hit home run in Pirates history on August 20.

Russell was traded in November 1947 to the Boston Braves in a five-player transaction that included Danny Murtaugh, Johnny Hopp and Bill Salkeld. But then he was stricken with bacterial endocarditis brought on by the rheumatic fever he had as a child. It cost him the rest of the season and a chance to play in the 1948 World Series. 

Russell was claimed on waivers from the Braves after the 1949 season by the Brooklyn Dodgers. He spent the next two seasons shuttling between the parent club and the Dodgers' top farm team in Montreal. In 1952 and 1953, he returned to the minors and finished his playing career with the Portland Beavers of the Pacific Coast League. 

As a big-leaguer, Russell appeared in 1,035 games played over his ten-season career and batted .267 with 428 RBI. His 959 hits included 175 doubles, 51 triples and 67 home runs. Defensively, he recorded an overall .981 fielding percentage playing at all three outfield positions and first base.
 
From 1954 until 1963, he scouted for the Dodgers and Washington Senators.

The first player in Pittsburgh Pirates history to hit a grand slam as a pinch-hitter, Russell was also the first player in Major League Baseball history to homer from both sides of the plate in the same game on two separate occasions, doing so on June 7, 1948 for the Boston Braves and on July 26, 1950 while with the Brooklyn Dodgers. He also had a pair of doubles in the 1948 game for 12 total bases.

References

External links 

1918 births
1987 deaths
Baseball players from Pennsylvania
Beaver Falls Browns players
Boston Braves players
Brooklyn Dodgers players
Brooklyn Dodgers scouts
Butler Yankees players
Deaths from endocarditis
Los Angeles Dodgers scouts
Major League Baseball outfielders
Mayfield Browns players
Memphis Chickasaws players
Meridian Eagles players
Montreal Royals players
People from Fayette County, Pennsylvania
Pittsburgh Pirates players
Portland Beavers players
St. Joseph Autos players
Toronto Maple Leafs (International League) players
Youngstown Browns players
Washington Senators (1961–1971) scouts